The men's singles tournament of the 2019 BWF World Championships (World Badminton Championships) took place from 19 to 25 August.

Seeds 

The seeding list is based on the World Rankings from 30 July 2019.

  Kento Momota (champion)
  Chou Tien-chen (quarterfinals)
  Chen Long (quarterfinals)
  Jonatan Christie (quarterfinals)
  Anders Antonsen (final)
  Anthony Sinisuka Ginting (third round)
  Srikanth Kidambi (third round)
  Kenta Nishimoto (third round)

  Ng Ka Long (third round)
  Sameer Verma (first round)
  Lin Dan (second round)
  Kantaphon Wangcharoen (semifinals)
  Kanta Tsuneyama (third round)
  Lee Zii Jia (quarterfinals)
  Tommy Sugiarto (second round)
  B. Sai Praneeth (semifinals)

Draw

Finals

Top half

Section 1

Section 2

Bottom half

Section 3

Section 4

References

2019 BWF World Championships